Phalonidia basiochreana is a species of moth of the family Tortricidae. It is found in California, United States.

References

Moths described in 1907
Phalonidia